Theodora Doukaina Komnene Palaiologina (– 4 March 1303), usually known simply as Theodora Palaiologina, was the empress consort of the Byzantine emperor Michael VIII Palaiologos.

Family
Theodora Vatatzaina was a daughter of John Doukas (born 1215) and his wife Eudokia Angelina. Her paternal grandfather was sebastokrator Isaac Doukas Vatatzes (died 1261), the older brother of the Nicaean emperor John III Doukas Vatatzes. Theodora's maternal grandfather was protostrator John Komnenos Angelos; his name indicates he was a member of the Angelos family, but his exact relations to the reigning members of the family are not known. Her grandmother's name is not known.

Marriage
Acropolites mentions that the father of Theodora died in young manhood. Her mother died in the early 1250s. Leaving Theodora to be raised by her great-uncle John III who was said to have "loved her like a daughter". In 1253, John III arranged the marriage of Theodora to Michael Palaiologos, who had been steadily rising in distinction due to a combination of familial connections and military abilities.

John III died on 3 November 1254. He was succeeded by his only son Theodore II Laskaris, who died four years later leaving his only son John IV Laskaris, a youth of seven. Michael maneuvered his way into first becoming regent of John IV, then advancing step by step to despotes making him next in order to Emperor. The final step came at the beginning of 1259 when Michael and John were crowned as co-emperors. There is no clear indication that Theodora was crowned empress at this time, but Alice-Mary Talbot notes the historian George Pachymeres contrasts the imperial couple with the young John who wore less impressive regalia.

On 25 July 1261, Alexios Strategopoulos captured Constantinople, the capital of the Byzantine Empire that had been shattered by the Fourth Crusade. Michael took advantage of the success of his general and entered the city on 15 August 1261 and was soon followed by Theodora and their children. In September Michael was crowned Emperor a second time in the cathedral of Hagia Sophia; although D. Geanakoplos assumes that Theodora also received a second coronation, this is not expressly stated by Pachymeres.

About the time of this achievement, Theodora confronted a crisis in her marriage. According to Pachymeres, Michael became enamored of Anna-Constance of Hohenstaufen, who had been briefly married to John Vatatzes before his death; he offered to divorce Theodora if she would marry him. When Theodora learned of this, she turned to Patriarch Arsenios Autoreianos for help. The Patriarch confronted the emperor and pressured him to abandon his plans. Michael yielded and allow Anna to leave for home in December 1261.

There is little evidence for Theodora's political role in the reign of her husband. She took an interest in the marriages of her two daughters Anna and Irene. She also intervened to gain clemency for courtiers who fell into disfavor. The evidence of her activities primarily concern her support of monastic communities. A number of documents survive from the archives of the Patmos and Lembiotissa monasteries from the years 1259 to 1281 attesting to her active involvement. When Michael pursued a policy of church union at the Second Council of Lyons in 1274, there is evidence showing Theodora originally sympathized with the anti-unionists. When she failed to persuade Michael to change his mind, she apparently supported the policy out of loyalty to Michael for she was later forced to publicly recant in 1283.

At some point after Michael's death in 1282, Theodora undertook the restoration of Lips monastery (now the Fenari Isa Mosque) which had been founded in the 10th century, and added a convent. In reconstructing the convent she added a second church, dedicated to St. John the Baptist. Talbot explains one motivation for her interest in the convent of Lips was to provide a place for her daughters and granddaughters to retire in their old age, per the current custom. Another was to provide a resting place for her family, having seen how Michael had been denied Christian burial. Talbot explains, "Theodora, as dowager empress and matriarch of the family, no doubt was determined to make provision for proper burial for herself and her descendants."

Lastly, Theodora played a role in supporting scholarship and promoting the production of manuscripts. For example, soon after the recovery of Constantinople, she commissioned the monk Arsenios to translate into Greek a work on geometry by the Persian philosopher al-Zanati. The tract is preserved in Naples manuscript (II C 33), with a note that provides information about Theodora's patronage.

Theodora died after a short illness on 4 March 1304. Her son the Emperor Andronikos II Palaiologos prepared a magnificent funeral, and she was laid to rest in the church of John the Baptist at Lips convent, where she had prepared her tomb some years earlier. The funeral oration was delivered by Theodore Metochites.

Children
Theodora and Michael VIII had seven children:
 Manuel Palaiologos (c. 1255–before 1259)
 Irene Palaiologina (c. 1256–before 1328), who married emperor Ivan Asen III of Bulgaria
 Andronikos II Palaiologos (1259–1332)
 Anna Palaiologina (c. 1260–1299/1300), who married Demetrios/Michael Komnenos Doukas, third son of Michael II of Epirus
 Constantine Palaiologos (1261–1306), who married Eirene Raoulaina his second cousin
 Theodora Palaiologina, who married King David VI of Georgia
 Eudokia Palaiologina, who married Emperor John II of Trebizond
 Theodore Palaiologos (c. 1263 – after 1310)

References

Sources

 
 

1240s births
1303 deaths
Theodora
13th-century Byzantine empresses
14th-century Byzantine women
Empresses of Nicaea
Vatatzes family
Burials at Lips Monastery
Michael VIII Palaiologos
Mothers of Byzantine emperors